Quatre Bornes State Secondary School (QBSSS) is a government-operated secondary school in Quatre Bornes, Mauritius.

The school opened on the grounds of the Sodnac SSS in 2005. It moved to Belle Rose SSS and then to the former Strattford College facility in 2009. The permanent school building opened in 2010.

References

External links
 Quatre Bornes State Secondary School

Schools in Mauritius
Quatre Bornes
Educational institutions established in 2005
2005 establishments in Mauritius